The Ministry of Housing, Physical Planning and Environment is a ministry of the Government of South Sudan. The incumbent minister is Jema Nunu Kumba, while Mary Nyawulang serves as deputy minister.

List of Ministers of Housing, Physical Planning and Environment

References

Housing, Physical Planning and Environment
South Sudan
South Sudan, Housing, Physical Planning and Environment
South Sudan